The Jiwani Coastal Wetland is a wetland located in Balochistan, Pakistan, near the town of Jiwani. The site is one of the 19 Ramsar sites in Pakistan and was inducted in 2001.

Location and geography
The site is located at the edge of Gawater Bay along the delta of Dasht River near Jiwani town in Gwadar District of Balochistan. The wetland has an area of  extending westward towards the Iranian border and is contiguous with the Govater Bay of Iran.Bay water is divided as Gawater Bay and Govater Bay.  The eastern side of the coast is known as Dran and is composed of sandy beaches with rocky cliffs. Towards the Iranian border, it has a plain and low swampy geology. Climatic condition in the area is arid with very low rainfall. Dasht river is the main source of fresh water for the mangrove forest and the region along with seasonal runoff of rainwater from the nearby hills.

Flora and fauna
Jiwani coast provides two main ecological habitats; the mangrove swamps and the sandy beaches. The site near the delta is swampy and marshy and is covered with one of the three species of Mangroves in Pakistan; Avicennia marina. Jiwani is also an important nesting site for the endangered olive ridley sea turtle and green sea turtles. The four turtle beaches where they nest are clustered on the eastern side of the coastline and are considered one of the most important marine turtle sites in Pakistan. Each year, thousands of migratory birds are sighted in the region. According to the book Avian Diversity of Jiwani Coastal Wetlands, Pakistan, 112 species of birds were recorded of which 79 species were migratory and 33 were resident. Of the 79 migratory species, 54 migrated during winters, 11 migrated during summers, 10 were year round visitors, and 3 species were vagrant.

Conservation
Fishing is the major source of income for the locals however plans to grant fishing and offshore drilling rights to foreign firms have increased the concerns of conservation authorities. Local community uses the mangrove wood for domestic use which is threatening the mangrove forest. Balochistan Conservation Strategy to promote sustainable development in Balochistan emphasises the conservation of these coastal wetland. In 1999, WWF Pakistan initiated conservation drives, Mangrove Conservation Project and Turtle Conservation Project, to protect the wetlands from adverse effects and threats.

Gallery

See also
Wetlands of Pakistan
Protected areas of Pakistan

References

External links
 Comparative Avian Faunal Diversity of Jiwani Coastal Wetlands and Taunsa Barrage Wildlife Sanctuary, Pakistan

Jiwani
Mangrove ecoregions
Natural history of Balochistan, Pakistan
Ramsar sites in Pakistan
Wetlands of Pakistan
Gwadar District
Landforms of Balochistan (Pakistan)